"Honolulu Lulu" is a song written by Jan Berry and Roger Christian, and Lou Adler for the American rock band Jan and Dean. It was the second hit single from their 1963 album Surf City And Other Swingin' Cities, charting at number 58 on the Billboard Hot 100.
It was also included later on their 1966 album Filet of Soul.

Performers
Jan Berry: Lead vocals
Dean Torrence: Backing vocals and harmonies

References

Jan and Dean songs
Songs written by Roger Christian (songwriter)
1963 singles
Songs written by Jan Berry
1963 songs
Liberty Records singles
Songs written by Lou Adler